List of cities in Congo may refer to:

List of cities in the Democratic Republic of the Congo
List of cities in the Republic of the Congo